Cameron Muir Dugmore (born 16 September 1963) is a South African politician who is the Leader of the Opposition in the Western Cape Provincial Parliament. A member of the African National Congress, he has been serving as a Member of the Western Cape Provincial Parliament since 2014. He previously served in the provincial parliament from 1994 to 2009. He served as the Western Cape Provincial Minister of Cultural Affairs and Sport from 2008 to 2009, and as the Western Cape Provincial Minister of Education from 2004 to 2008.

Early life and activism

Cameron Muir Dugmore was born in 1963 as Gillian and Ron Dugmore's second of five children. His mother was a Black Sash member. He often moved from city to city, living in Pietermaritzburg, Grahamstown and Komga where his father was a teacher and head of school. From 1969 to 1974, he attended Union Preparatory School. He was enrolled at York High School in George in 1977. In 1978, he participated in anti-apartheid activities. The activities included removal of beach apartheid signs at Herolds Bay and Victoria Bay. The activities were led by his mother.

He served as Head Boy and matriculated from York High School. In 1982, he went to the University of Cape Town to study languages and law.

While there in 1983, he joined the National Union of South African Students (Nusas). He also served as President of the Law Students Council. He chaired the NUSAS Education Action Committee. In 1984, he attained a BA in Arts and Law.

In 1985, he represented NUSAS UCT in the Education Charter Campaign led by the non-racial student movement. He took office as vice president of the Student Representative Council in 1986 and not long after, in 1988, he was elected president and joined the End Conscription Campaign as a conscientious objector.

In 1989, he was appointed to the United Democratic Front Western Cape Interim Committee and represented the UDF Western Cape at national meetings. In 1990, he took office as the first secretary of the National Sports Congress (NSC). The UDF Western Cape later appointed him as an organiser.

Political career

In 1991, he became a member of the African National Congress and was involved in the Rondebosch (Gaby Shapiro) branch. He was elected to the African National Congress Regional Executive Committee and was soon appointed the head of the organising department in 1992 and 1993. He was also appointed the head of the African National Congress Western Cape Elections Voter Organisation and Training (VOT).

In 1994, he was elected as an ANC MPP and served as a PEC/PWC member. He also served as the PEC spokesperson. He was a branch delegate to the Mafikeng Conference in 1997. He headed the communication faction of the ANC's 1999 election campaign. He was re-elected in 1999. Dugmore served as a branch delegate to the Stellenbosch Conference in 2002.

In 2004, Premier Ebrahim Rasool appointed Dugmore to the post of Provincial Minister of Education. Rasool was recalled in 2008 and replaced by Lynne Brown as Premier. Brown designated Dugmore to the position of Provincial Minister of Cultural Affairs and Sport.

Dugmore left the Provincial Parliament in 2009 and was consequently appointed as convenor of the ANC Overberg Fishing Task Team. From 2010 to 2014, he was a special advisor to Trevor Manuel. He helped establish the Mitchells Plain Bursary and Role Model Trust, as well as the Mitchells Plain Skills Centre and the Mitchells Plain Education Forum. He was a delegate to the ANC Conference in Mangaung in 2012 but was denied accreditation at the conference and therefore could not represent the Western Cape branch.

In 2014, he returned to the Western Cape Provincial Parliament as an MPP for Hessequa. He was a branch delegate to the National Policy Conference in 2017.

In 2018, Dugmore declared his candidacy to replace embattled former ANC Western Cape Chairperson, Marius Fransman. Dugmore was mentioned as a possible ANC Western Cape Premier candidate for the 2019 elections.

In May 2019, he was re-elected to another term in the Western Cape Provincial Parliament. On 20 May 2019, the African National Congress named him the incoming Leader of the Opposition in the Western Cape Provincial Parliament. He assumed the office on 22 May 2019.

Dugmore was criticized for attending a Russian consulate event on 28 February 2022, four days after the start of Russia's 2022 invasion of Ukraine. At the event Dugmore gave a video interview in which he advocated for a neutral position on the invasion and criticised the Democratic Alliance's position supporting Ukraine.  Dugmore's position was criticised by the Financial Mail as a type of "moral relativism" that ignores an "unprovoked, illegal invasion of a sovereign state."

Incident
In March 2018, violent protests occurred in Hermanus and the surrounding area. Provincial Minister of Human Settlements, Bonginkosi Madikizela, said that he would submit a motion in the Provincial Parliament to refer Dugmore to the ethics committee for allegedly inciting violence. The provincial ANC  denied the allegations.

Personal life
Dugmore lives in the suburb of Rondebosch in Cape Town. He is married to Melanie Lue. They have three children.

References

|-

1963 births
20th-century South African politicians
21st-century South African politicians
African National Congress politicians
Living people
Members of the Western Cape Provincial Parliament
Politicians from Cape Town
University of Cape Town alumni
White South African anti-apartheid activists